The Attie are an Akan people who live predominantly in Ivory Coast.

References

Akan
Ethnic groups in Ivory Coast